Takami Dam is a dam in Hokkaidō, Japan. It has an electrical generation output of 200MW.

History
The dam was constructed to control flooding of the Shizunai River and also to generate electricity. It was constructed by Kajima, Aoki Corporation, and Chizaki Kogyo Construction. It was completed in 1983. Power generation commenced in July 1983. A second power generation unit was completed in April 1993.

Characteristics
The dam is approximately 120 metres high and 435 metres long.

The electrical generation output is 200MW. Power is supplied to the Hokkaido Electric Power Company.

References

1983 establishments in Japan
Dams in Hokkaido
Dams completed in 1983
Shinhidaka, Hokkaido